Live from Neon Park is the second live album by the American rock band Little Feat, released in 1996. The name of the album was a suggestion of a Little Feat fan in commemoration of the then-recent passing of long-time Little Feat album cover artist and friend of the band, Neon Park.

Track listing
Disc one
"Introductions" – 1:47
"Two Trains" (George) – 5:43
"Spanish Moon/Skin It Back" – 10:23
"Rock and Roll Everynight" – 5:07
"Down on the Farm" (Barrère, Barrère) – 6:23
"Willin'" (George) – 5:41
"Hate to Lose Your Lovin'" (Barrère, Fuller) – 4:21
"Can't Be Satisfied/They're Red Hot (Hot Tamales) [medley]" (Johnson, Waters) – 4:49
"Cadillac Hotel" (Payne, Wray) – 6:50
"Changin' Luck" (Fuller, Payne, Tackett) – 7:22
"You're Taking Up Another Man's Place" (Isaac Hayes, David Porter) – 6:54
"Oh, Atlanta" (Payne) – 5:35

Disc two
"Texas Twister" (Barrère, Kibbee, Payne, Tackett) – 5:17
"Fat Man in the Bathtub" (George) – 7:11
"Representing the Mambo" (Barrère, Park, Payne, Tackett) – 7:51
"Long Distance Love" (George) – 3:35
"Rad Gumbo" (Barrère, Clayton, Gradney, Kibbee, Park, Payne) – 3:54
"Dixie Chicken" (George, Kibbee) – 17:28
"Feats Don't Fail Me Now" (Barrère, George, Kibbee) – 7:49
"Sailin' Shoes" (George) – 5:13
"Let It Roll/High Roller" [Acoustic] – 12:07

Personnel

Little Feat
Paul Barrère – guitar, vocals
Sam Clayton – percussion, vocals
Kenny Gradney – bass
Richie Hayward – drums, vocals
Shaun Murphy – vocals, percussion
Bill Payne – keyboards, vocals
Fred Tackett – guitar, mandolin, trumpet

Guest musicians
Craig Fuller – vocals, guitar on "Hate To Lose Your Lovin'"
Inara George (daughter of Lowell) – vocals on "Sailin' Shoes"
Piero Mariani (husband of Shaun Murphy) – electronic percussion
Miles Tackett (son of Fred) – guitar on "Dixie Chicken"
Joel Tepp – clarinet

Texicali Horns
Darrell Leonard – trumpet
Joe Sublett – tenor saxophone
David Woodford – tenor and baritone saxophone

References

Albums produced by Bill Payne
Little Feat live albums
1996 live albums
Zoo Entertainment (record label) live albums